The 2023 Oakland Athletics season will be the 123rd season for the Oakland Athletics franchise, all as members of the American League. It is their 56th season in Oakland (all at Oakland Coliseum).

Offseason

Coaching changes 
On November 7, 2022, the Athletics announced that bench coach Brad Ausmus would not return for the 2023 season. On November 28, the club announced that Darren Bush would be promoted from third base coach to bench coach. The A's also announced that Eric Martins would move over from first base coach to third base, as Mike Aldrete takes over as first base coach. Oakland also named Mike McCarthy as bullpen coach.

Rule changes 
Pursuant to the CBA, new rule changes will be in place for the 2023 season:

 institution of a pitch clock between pitches;
 limits on pickoff attempts per plate appearance;
 limits on defensive shifts requiring two infielders to be on either side of second and be within the boundary of the infield; and
 larger bases (increased to 18-inch squares);

Transactions

October 2022

Source

November 2022

Source

December 2022

Source

January 2023

Source

February 2023

Source

March 2023

Source

Regular season

Game log

|- style="background: 
| 1 || March 30 || Angels || – || || || — || Oakland Coliseum || || – || 
|- style="background: 
| 2 || April 1 || Angels || – || || || — || Oakland Coliseum || || – ||
|- style="background: 
| 3 || April 2 || Angels || – || || || — || Oakland Coliseum || || – ||
|- style="background: 
| 4 || April 3 || Guardians || – || || || — || Oakland Coliseum || || – ||
|- style="background: 
| 5 || April 4 || Guardians || – || || || — || Oakland Coliseum || || – ||
|- style="background: 
| 6 || April 5 || Guardians || – || || || — || Oakland Coliseum || || – ||
|- style="background: 
| 7 || April 7 || @ Rays || – || || || — || Tropicana Field || || – ||
|- style="background: 
| 8 || April 8 || @ Rays || – || || || — || Tropicana Field || || – ||
|- style="background: 
| 9 || April 9 || @ Rays || – || || || — || Tropicana Field || || – ||
|- style="background: 
| 10 || April 10 || @ Orioles || – || || || — || Camden Yards || || – ||
|- style="background: 
| 11 || April 11 || @ Orioles || – || || || — || Camden Yards || || – ||
|- style="background: 
| 12 || April 12 || @ Orioles || – || || || — || Camden Yards || || – ||
|- style="background: 
| 13 || April 13 || @ Orioles || – || || || — || Camden Yards || || – ||
|- style="background: 
| 14 || April 14 || Mets || – || || || — || Oakland Coliseum || || – ||
|- style="background: 
| 15 || April 15 || Mets || – || || || — || Oakland Coliseum || || – ||
|- style="background: 
| 16 || April 16 || Mets || – || || || — || Oakland Coliseum || || – ||
|- style="background: 
| 17 || April 17 || Cubs || – || || || — || Oakland Coliseum || || – ||
|- style="background: 
| 18 || April 18 || Cubs || – || || || — || Oakland Coliseum || || – ||
|- style="background: 
| 19 || April 19 || Cubs || – || || || — || Oakland Coliseum || || – ||
|- style="background: 
| 20 || April 21 || @ Rangers || – || || || — || Globe Life Field || || – ||
|- style="background: 
| 21 || April 22 || @ Rangers || – || || || — || Globe Life Field || || – ||
|- style="background: 
| 22 || April 23 || @ Rangers || – || || || — || Globe Life Field || || – ||
|- style="background: 
| 23 || April 24 || @ Angels || – || || || — || Angel Stadium || || – ||
|- style="background: 
| 24 || April 25 || @ Angels || – || || || — || Angel Stadium || || – ||
|- style="background: 
| 25 || April 26 || @ Angels || – || || || — || Angel Stadium || || – ||
|- style="background: 
| 26 || April 27 || @ Angels || – || || || — || Angel Stadium || || – ||
|- style="background: 
| 27 || April 28 || Reds || – || || || — || Oakland Coliseum || || – ||
|- style="background: 
| 28 || April 29 || Reds || – || || || — || Oakland Coliseum || || – ||
|- style="background: 
| 29 || April 30 || Reds || – || || || — || Oakland Coliseum || || – ||
|- 
 

|- style="background: 
| 30 || May 2 || Mariners || – || || || — || Oakland Coliseum || || – ||
|- style="background: 
| 31 || May 3 || Mariners || – || || || — || Oakland Coliseum || || – ||
|- style="background: 
| 32 || May 4 || Mariners || – || || || — || Oakland Coliseum || || – ||
|- style="background: 
| 33 || May 5 || @ Royals || – || || || — || Kauffman Stadium || || – ||
|- style="background: 
| 34 || May 6 || @ Royals || – || || || — || Kauffman Stadium || || – ||
|- style="background: 
| 35 || May 7 || @ Royals || – || || || — || Kauffman Stadium || || – ||
|- style="background: 
| 36 || May 8 || @ Yankees || – || || || — || Yankee Stadium || || – ||
|- style="background: 
| 37 || May 9 || @ Yankees || – || || || — || Yankee Stadium || || – ||
|- style="background: 
| 38 || May 10 || @ Yankees || – || || || — || Yankee Stadium || || – ||
|- style="background: 
| 39 || May 11 || Rangers || – || || || — || Oakland Coliseum || || – ||
|- style="background: 
| 40 || May 12 || Rangers || – || || || — || Oakland Coliseum || || – ||
|- style="background: 
| 41 || May 13 || Rangers || – || || || — || Oakland Coliseum || || – ||
|- style="background: 
| 42 || May 14 || Rangers || – || || || — || Oakland Coliseum || || – ||
|- style="background: 
| 43 || May 15 || Diamondbacks || – || || || — || Oakland Coliseum || || – ||
|- style="background: 
| 44 || May 16 || Diamondbacks || – || || || — || Oakland Coliseum || || – ||
|- style="background: 
| 45 || May 17 || Diamondbacks || – || || || — || Oakland Coliseum || || – ||
|- style="background: 
| 46 || May 19 || @ Astros || – || || || — || Minute Maid Park || || – ||
|- style="background: 
| 47 || May 20 || @ Astros || – || || || — || Minute Maid Park || || – ||
|- style="background: 
| 48 || May 21 || @ Astros || – || || || — || Minute Maid Park || || – ||
|- style="background: 
| 49 || May 22 || @ Mariners || – || || || — || T-Mobile Park || || – ||
|- style="background: 
| 50 || May 23 || @ Mariners || – || || || — || T-Mobile Park || || – ||
|- style="background: 
| 51 || May 24 || @ Mariners || – || || || — || T-Mobile Park || || – ||
|- style="background: 
| 52 || May 25 || @ Mariners || – || || || — || T-Mobile Park || || – ||
|- style="background: 
| 53 || May 26 || Astros || – || || || — || Oakland Coliseum || || – ||
|- style="background: 
| 54 || May 27 || Astros || – || || || — || Oakland Coliseum || || – ||
|- style="background: 
| 55 || May 28 || Astros || – || || || — || Oakland Coliseum || || – ||
|- style="background: 
| 56 || May 29 || Braves || – || || || — || Oakland Coliseum || || – ||
|- style="background: 
| 57 || May 30 || Braves || – || || || — || Oakland Coliseum || || – ||
|- style="background: 
| 58 || May 31 || Braves || – || || || — || Oakland Coliseum || || – ||
|- 
 

|- style="background: 
| 59 || June 2 || @ Marlins || – || || || — || LoanDepot Park || || – ||
|- style="background: 
| 60 || June 3 || @ Marlins || – || || || — || LoanDepot Park || || – ||
|- style="background: 
| 61 || June 4 || @ Marlins || – || || || — || LoanDepot Park || || – ||
|- style="background: 
| 62 || June 5 || @ Pirates || – || || || — || PNC Park || || – ||
|- style="background: 
| 63 || June 6 || @ Pirates || – || || || — || PNC Park || || – ||
|- style="background: 
| 64 || June 7 || @ Pirates || – || || || — || PNC Park || || – ||
|- style="background: 
| 65 || June 9 || @ Brewers || – || || || — || American Family Field || || – ||
|- style="background: 
| 66 || June 10 || @ Brewers || – || || || — || American Family Field || || – ||
|- style="background: 
| 67 || June 11 || @ Brewers || – || || || — || American Family Field || || – ||
|- style="background: 
| 68 || June 12 || Rays || – || || || — || Oakland Coliseum || || – ||
|- style="background: 
| 69 || June 13 || Rays || – || || || — || Oakland Coliseum || || – ||
|- style="background: 
| 70 || June 14 || Rays || – || || || — || Oakland Coliseum || || – ||
|- style="background: 
| 71 || June 15 || Rays || – || || || — || Oakland Coliseum || || – ||
|- style="background: 
| 72 || June 16 || Phillies || – || || || — || Oakland Coliseum || || – ||
|- style="background: 
| 73 || June 17 || Phillies || – || || || — || Oakland Coliseum || || – ||
|- style="background: 
| 74 || June 18 || Phillies || – || || || — || Oakland Coliseum || || – ||
|- style="background: 
| 75 || June 20 || @ Guardians || – || || || — || Progressive Field || || – ||
|- style="background: 
| 76 || June 21 || @ Guardians || – || || || — || Progressive Field || || – ||
|- style="background: 
| 77 || June 22 || @ Guardians || – || || || — || Progressive Field || || – ||
|- style="background: 
| 78 || June 23 || @ Blue Jays || – || || || — || Rogers Centre || || – ||
|- style="background: 
| 79 || June 24 || @ Blue Jays || – || || || — || Rogers Centre || || – ||
|- style="background: 
| 80 || June 25 || @ Blue Jays || – || || || — || Rogers Centre || || – ||
|- style="background: 
| 81 || June 27 || Yankees || – || || || — || Oakland Coliseum || || – ||
|- style="background: 
| 82 || June 28 || Yankees || – || || || — || Oakland Coliseum || || – ||
|- style="background: 
| 83 || June 29 || Yankees || – || || || — || Oakland Coliseum || || – ||
|- style="background: 
| 84 || June 30 || White Sox || – || || || — || Oakland Coliseum || || – ||
|- 
 

|- style="background: 
| 85 || July 1 || White Sox || – || || || — || Oakland Coliseum || || – ||
|- style="background: 
| 86 || July 2 || White Sox || – || || || — || Oakland Coliseum || || – ||
|- style="background: 
| 87 || July 4 || @ Tigers || – || || || — || Comerica Park || || – ||
|- style="background: 
| 88 || July 5 || @ Tigers || – || || || — || Comerica Park || || – ||
|- style="background: 
| 89 || July 6 || @ Tigers || – || || || — || Comerica Park || || – ||
|- style="background: 
| 90 || July 7 || @ Red Sox || – || || || — || Fenway Park || || – ||
|- style="background: 
| 91 || July 8 || @ Red Sox || – || || || — || Fenway Park || || – ||
|- style="background: 
| 92 || July 9 || @ Red Sox || – || || || — || Fenway Park || || – ||
|-style=background:#bbbfff
| – || July 11 || colspan="9"|93rd All-Star Game in Seattle, WA
|- style="background: 
| 93 || July 14 || Twins || – || || || — || Oakland Coliseum || || – ||
|- style="background: 
| 94 || July 15 || Twins || – || || || — || Oakland Coliseum || || – ||
|- style="background: 
| 95 || July 16 || Twins || – || || || — || Oakland Coliseum || || – ||
|- style="background: 
| 96 || July 17 || Red Sox || – || || || — || Oakland Coliseum || || – ||
|- style="background: 
| 97 || July 18 || Red Sox || – || || || — || Oakland Coliseum || || – ||
|- style="background: 
| 98 || July 19 || Red Sox || – || || || — || Oakland Coliseum || || – ||
|- style="background: 
| 99 || July 20 || Astros || – || || || — || Oakland Coliseum || || – ||
|- style="background: 
| 100 || July 21 || Astros || – || || || — || Oakland Coliseum || || – ||
|- style="background: 
| 101 || July 22 || Astros || – || || || — || Oakland Coliseum || || – ||
|- style="background: 
| 102 || July 23 || Astros || – || || || — || Oakland Coliseum || || – ||
|- style="background: 
| 103 || July 25 || @ Giants || – || || || — || Oracle Park || || – ||
|- style="background: 
| 104 || July 26 || @ Giants || – || || || — || Oracle Park || || – ||
|- style="background: 
| 105 || July 28 || @ Rockies || – || || || — || Coors Field || || – ||
|- style="background: 
| 106 || July 29 || @ Rockies || – || || || — || Coors Field || || – ||
|- style="background: 
| 107 || July 30 || @ Rockies || – || || || — || Coors Field || || – ||
|- 
 

|- style="background: 
| 108 || August 1 || @ Dodgers || – || || || — || Dodger Stadium || || – ||
|- style="background: 
| 109 || August 2 || @ Dodgers || – || || || — || Dodger Stadium || || – ||
|- style="background: 
| 110 || August 3 || @ Dodgers || – || || || — || Dodger Stadium || || – ||
|- style="background: 
| 111 || August 5 || Giants || – || || || — || Oakland Coliseum || || – ||
|- style="background: 
| 112 || August 6 || Giants || – || || || — || Oakland Coliseum || || – ||
|- style="background: 
| 113 || August 7 || Rangers || – || || || — || Oakland Coliseum || || – ||
|- style="background: 
| 114 || August 8 || Rangers || – || || || — || Oakland Coliseum || || – ||
|- style="background: 
| 115 || August 9 || Rangers || – || || || — || Oakland Coliseum || || – ||
|- style="background: 
| 116 || August 11 || @ Nationals || – || || || — || Nationals Park || || – ||
|- style="background: 
| 117 || August 12 || @ Nationals || – || || || — || Nationals Park || || – ||
|- style="background: 
| 118 || August 13 || @ Nationals || – || || || — || Nationals Park || || – ||
|- style="background: 
| 119 || August 14 || @ Cardinals || – || || || — || Busch Stadium || || – ||
|- style="background: 
| 120 || August 15 || @ Cardinals || – || || || — || Busch Stadium || || – ||
|- style="background: 
| 121 || August 16 || @ Cardinals || – || || || — || Busch Stadium || || – ||
|- style="background: 
| 122 || August 18 || Orioles || – || || || — || Oakland Coliseum || || – ||
|- style="background: 
| 123 || August 19 || Orioles || – || || || — || Oakland Coliseum || || – ||
|- style="background: 
| 124 || August 20 || Orioles || – || || || — || Oakland Coliseum || || – ||
|- style="background: 
| 125 || August 21 || Royals || – || || || — || Oakland Coliseum || || – ||
|- style="background: 
| 126 || August 22 || Royals || – || || || — || Oakland Coliseum || || – ||
|- style="background: 
| 127 || August 23 || Royals || – || || || — || Oakland Coliseum || || – ||
|- style="background: 
| 128 || August 24 || @ White Sox || – || || || — || Guaranteed Rate Field || || – ||
|- style="background: 
| 129 || August 25 || @ White Sox || – || || || — || Guaranteed Rate Field || || – ||
|- style="background: 
| 130 || August 26 || @ White Sox || – || || || — || Guaranteed Rate Field || || – ||
|- style="background: 
| 131 || August 27 || @ White Sox || – || || || — || Guaranteed Rate Field || || – ||
|- style="background: 
| 132 || August 28 || @ Mariners || – || || || — || T-Mobile Park || || – ||
|- style="background: 
| 133 || August 29 || @ Mariners || – || || || — || T-Mobile Park || || – ||
|- style="background: 
| 134 || August 30 || @ Mariners || – || || || — || T-Mobile Park || || – ||
|- 
 

|- style="background: 
| 135 || September 1 || Angels || – || || || — || Oakland Coliseum || || – ||
|- style="background: 
| 136 || September 2 || Angels || – || || || — || Oakland Coliseum || || – ||
|- style="background: 
| 137 || September 3 || Angels || – || || || — || Oakland Coliseum || || – ||
|- style="background: 
| 138 || September 4 || Blue Jays || – || || || — || Oakland Coliseum || || – ||
|- style="background: 
| 139 || September 5 || Blue Jays || – || || || — || Oakland Coliseum || || – ||
|- style="background: 
| 140 || September 6 || Blue Jays || – || || || — || Oakland Coliseum || || – ||
|- style="background: 
| 141 || September 8 || @ Rangers || – || || || — || Globe Life Field || || – ||
|- style="background: 
| 142 || September 9 || @ Rangers || – || || || — || Globe Life Field || || – ||
|- style="background: 
| 143 || September 10 || @ Rangers || – || || || — || Globe Life Field || || – ||
|- style="background: 
| 144 || September 11 || @ Astros || – || || || — || Minute Maid Park || || – ||
|- style="background: 
| 145 || September 12 || @ Astros || – || || || — || Minute Maid Park || || – ||
|- style="background: 
| 146 || September 13 || @ Astros || – || || || — || Minute Maid Park || || – ||
|- style="background: 
| 147 || September 15 || Padres || – || || || — || Oakland Coliseum || || – ||
|- style="background: 
| 148 || September 16 || Padres || – || || || — || Oakland Coliseum || || – ||
|- style="background: 
| 149 || September 17 || Padres || – || || || — || Oakland Coliseum || || – ||
|- style="background: 
| 150 || September 18 || Mariners || – || || || — || Oakland Coliseum || || – ||
|- style="background: 
| 151 || September 19 || Mariners || – || || || — || Oakland Coliseum || || – ||
|- style="background: 
| 152 || September 20 || Mariners || – || || || — || Oakland Coliseum || || – ||
|- style="background: 
| 153 || September 21 || Tigers || – || || || — || Oakland Coliseum || || – ||
|- style="background: 
| 154 || September 22 || Tigers || – || || || — || Oakland Coliseum || || – ||
|- style="background: 
| 155 || September 23 || Tigers || – || || || — || Oakland Coliseum || || – ||
|- style="background: 
| 156 || September 24 || Tigers || – || || || — || Oakland Coliseum || || – ||
|- style="background: 
| 157 || September 26 || @ Twins || – || || || — || Target Field || || – ||
|- style="background: 
| 158 || September 27 || @ Twins || – || || || — || Target Field || || – ||
|- style="background: 
| 159 || September 28 || @ Twins || – || || || — || Target Field || || – ||
|- style="background: 
| 160 || September 29 || @ Angels || – || || || — || Angel Stadium || || – ||
|- style="background: 
| 161 || September 30 || @ Angels || – || || || — || Angel Stadium || || – ||
|- style="background: 
| 162 || October 1 || @ Angels || – || || || — || Angel Stadium || || – ||
|-

Season standings

Regular season

American League West

American League Wild Card

Roster

Farm system

Source:

References

External links
2023 Oakland Athletics season at Baseball Reference

Oakland Athletics seasons
Oakland Athletics
2020s in Oakland, California
Oakland Athletics